HMS Sultan was a broadside ironclad of the Royal Navy of the Victorian era, who carried her main armament in a central box battery. She was named for Sultan Abdulaziz of the Ottoman Empire, who was visiting England when she was laid down. Abdulaziz cultivated good relations with the Second French Empire and the British. In 1867 he was the first Ottoman sultan to visit Western Europe; his trip included a visit to England, where he was made a Knight of the Garter by Queen Victoria and shown a Royal Navy Fleet Review, with Isma'il Pasha of Egypt.

Design

Unlike the battery of the earlier ship, that of Sultan was on two levels; the main deck guns provided broadside fire, with limited ahead fire from the foremost gun, while the upper deck guns provided additional broadside fire and also could fire astern, by traversing the after gun on a turntable.

The hull had one of the roundest amidships cross-section ever adopted at the time of her launch, and this and the low metacentric height of only three feet made her a very steady gun platform. It was soon found, however, that she lacked adequate stability - in naval parlance she was "tender" - and some six hundred tons of extra ballast had to be inserted into her double bottom.

Service history
She was commissioned at Chatham for the Channel Fleet, in which she served until 1876. She was refitted, being reduced to barque rig, and posted to the Mediterranean under the command of His Royal Highness the Duke of Edinburgh. She was with Admiral Geoffrey Hornby at the Dardanelles in 1878.

She was then again refitted, and reduced to re-serve in 1882, when she returned to the Mediterranean under command of Captain W. J. Hunt-Grubbe. At the bombardment of Alexandria (1882) she sustained casualties of two killed and eight wounded from a single hit on the battery. She was with the Particular Service Squadron during the Russian war scare of June to August, 1885, and was retained in the Mediterranean thereafter. Her ram holed the steamship, which sank with some loss of life.

On 6 March 1889 she grounded on an uncharted rock in the Comino Channel between Malta and Gozo, ripping her bottom open. The Temeraire unsuccessfully tried to pull her off. The Sultan slowly flooded and in a gale on 14 March 1889 she slipped off the rock and sank. She was raised in August by the Italian firm of Baghino & Co for a fee of £50,000. On 27 August the Sultan was brought into Malta. Malta dockyard made preliminary repairs.

Modernisation
The Sultan was put in dry dock at Portsmouth. Between October 1892 and March 1896, she was modernised at a cost of over £200,000. She was given two tall funnels, a double bridge forward, and new decks. Her old sailing rig was removed, and replaced by two military masts with fighting tops. At natural draught, on trial in late May 1895, these made  giving an average speed . Parkes said that there was intense vibration on these trials.

As modernised her armament consisted of:
8 × 10-inch MLR
4 × 9-inch MLR
4 × 120mm 4.7-inch QF
9 × 57mm 6-pr QF (either Nordenfelt or Hotchkiss pattern)
13 × 47 mm 3-pr QF
7 × machineguns
2 × light field guns

As the modernisation affected the distribution of weights on the ship, her beam was increased with a waterline girdling of  teak, which raised her metacentric height.

The Engineer criticised the decision to retain the muzzle-loading guns, saying that "So much money has been spent on this ship since she was brought home from the Comino Channel that one would like to see a better result."  According to Parkes, "nothing could be done to strengthen the old M.L. battery"; he thought that the old ship was not worth the money spent modernising her.

Post-modernisation

She then served in the reserve. She commissioned for sea-service twice whilst in reserve:
For the 1896 annual manoeuvres, from 8 July to 25 August 1896, when she served as one of the battleships of the C Fleet based in Milford Haven.
For the 1900 annual manoeuvres, 10 July to 24 August 1900, when she served as one of the 12 battleships of the A Fleet based in Ireland.  The action on 2 August took the form of a general chase of the A Fleet by the stronger B Fleet.  To get away, the A Fleet steered a course against a strong head wind and heavy sea, which was sustained for hours.  This obliged the A Fleet to detach the old Dreadnought and send her to Queenstown.  The Sultan was able to keep up for a while, but when the A Fleet made 13 knots, the Sultan struggled to maintain station, and eventually had to be detached and sent to Berehaven, allowing the remaining battleships (of the Royal Sovereign and Majestic classes) to quicken speed to 14 knots and get away.

In 1906, she was partially dismantled and became an artificers' training ship under the name of Fisgard IV; in 1931 she was further converted into a mechanical repair ship, regaining her original name of Sultan. During World War II she was a depot ship for minesweepers at Portsmouth, and was sold in 1947.

Costs 

The initial cost of the Sultan (excluding armament) was £374,777, to which were apportioned dockyard incidental charges of £110,378. Included in the £374,777, was £76,000 for her trunk engines made by John Penn and Sons Ltd.  Subsequent outlay upon repairs, alterations sea stores, etc. are given in the following table.

References

Publications

 

Gossett, William Patrick (1986) The Lost Ships of the Royal Navy, 1793-1900. (London: Mansell).

External links
 

 

Battleships of the Royal Navy
Ships built in Chatham
1870 ships
Victorian-era battleships of the United Kingdom
Maritime incidents in December 1886
Maritime incidents in March 1889